Damaracheta is a genus of crickets in family Gryllidae.

Taxonomy
The genus contains the following species:
Damaracheta capensis Otte, 1987
Damaracheta kasungu Otte, 1987
Damaracheta kriegbaumi Otte & Hennig, 1998
Damaracheta mlozi Otte, 1987
Damaracheta schultzei (Karny, 1910)
Damaracheta zomba Otte, 1987

References

Gryllinae
Orthoptera genera
Taxa named by Dan Otte